Sitaram Jaipuria was  an Indian politician. He was a Member of Parliament  representing Uttar Pradesh in the Rajya Sabha the upper house of India's Parliament as an Independent.

References

Rajya Sabha members from Uttar Pradesh
1926 births
1985 deaths
Politicians from Jaipur